Florence Arthaud, born October 28, 1957, in Boulogne-Billancourt and died March 9, 2015, in Villa Castelli, Argentina, was a French sailor.

She was the first woman to win the Route du Rhum in 1990.

She lost her life in a helicopter accident in the Argentine province of La Rioja while she was participating in the filming of the reality TV show, Dropped, along with other French athletes.

Biography

Youth 
Florence Arthaud was the daughter of Jacques Arthaud, director of the Grenoble publishing house , Arthaud, during the 1970s, which notably published the memoirs of sailors Bernard Moitessier and Éric Tabarly. Arthaud started sailing at a very young age with her brother, Jean-Marie, and her father. She then sharpened her skills at the Antibes sailing club. 

In 1974, at the age of seventeen, Arthaud had a serious car accident, which resulted in a coma and paralysis. She was hospitalized for six months and her recovery took two years. During her convalescence, she made her first crossing of the Atlantic at the age of eighteen with Jean-Claude Parisis, a French navigator.

Sailing career 
Florence Arthaud raced the first edition of Route du Rhum, which took place in 1978. She placed 11th. In 1986, she diverted from the race to assist Loïc Caradec, but found the catamaran Royale capsized and no trace of the sailor. 

In August 1990, she tackled the record for a solo crossing the North Atlantic, held by Bruno Peyron. In 9 days 21 hours and 42 minutes, she beat the record by almost two days.  In November of the same year, she won the Route du Rhum, reaching Pointe-à-Pitre after 14 days 10 hours and 10 minutes. However, following this exploit, she was unable to find funding to build a new trimaran built, due to the real estate crisis from which her sponsor was suffering.

She sailed in the 1989–90 Whitbread Round the World Race on board Charles Jourdan. In 1997, she won the Transpacific with Bruno Peyron.  

In 2010, for the twentieth anniversary of her victory, she could not find a sponsor: « I was a little disgusted. They had reopened the race for tall ships. It was the 20th anniversary of my victory and I intended to participate in it on a huge trimaran, Oman (30m). But I didn't manage to get this boat, they preferred to give it to a man (Sidney Gavignet who retired due to damage). It definitely freaked me out and I was like ‘well, I'm done.’».

Sailing accident 
On October 29, 2011, she fell from her boat in the middle of the night off Cap Corse. By chance, she had with her a headlamp and a waterproof mobile phone. Arthaud managed to call her mother who then called her brother. He then alerted the CROSS (the French Coast Guard) and three hours and twenty minutes after her distress call, she was located using the geolocation of her mobile phone. Conscious but in a state of hypothermia, she was airlifted to a Bastia hospital, from which she was released the following day.

Private life 
In 1993, Florence Arthaud gave birth to Marie, born of her relationship with Loïc Lingois, a professional sailor. In 2005, she married Éric Charpentier, but the union dissolved very quickly. She was the companion of the navigator Philippe Monnet. In her autobiography, published in 2009, Arthaud is forthcoming about her difficult times, of the alcohol which cost her her drivers license in 2010, and of the defection of the sponsors which aborted all of her projects. She found comfort with the association ‘The wheel turns,’ which helps celebrities who are in trouble.

Other activities 
In 2014, she took part in Sea Shepherd's "GrindStop" campaign against pilot-whale whaling in the Faroe Islands.

Her autobiography, Un vent de liberté, prefaced by Olivier de Kersauson, was published in 2009. Before her death, Florence Arthaud was working on a race project reserved for women, the first edition of which was to take place in the Mediterranean during the summer of 2015.

The year before her death, she worked with the writer and playwright, Jean-Louis Bachelet, to write new memoir. She had completed the book, titled Tonight, the Sea is Black (Cette nuit, la mer est noire), which was released by her father’s publishing house on March 19, 2015, shortly after her death.

Death

On Monday March 9, 2015, Arthaud was killed in a helicopter crash in Argentina during filming of the television reality show, Dropped. Nine other people were killed in this accident, including French swimmer Camille Muffat and boxer Alexis Vastine. The other victims were the two Argentinian pilots and five French members of the production team, Adventure Line Productions. 

In accordance with her last wishes, Arthaud was cremated. Some of her ashes are buried on the Île Sainte-Marguerite, opposite Cannes, while the rest were scattered at sea.

See also 

 Isabelle Autissier
 Alain Colas
 Clarisse Crémer
 Michel Desjoyeaux
 Jean Le Cam
 Armel Le Cléac’h
 Bernard Moitessier
 Éric Tabarly
 Jean-Luc Van Den Heede
 Olivier de Kersauson

References

1957 births
2015 deaths
20th-century French women musicians
French female sailors (sport)
Victims of helicopter accidents or incidents
Victims of aviation accidents or incidents in Argentina
Sportspeople from Boulogne-Billancourt
Single-handed sailors
Volvo Ocean Race sailors